Miramas is a commune in the Bouches-du-Rhône department, in the Provence-Alpes-Côte d'Azur region, southern France. It is the second-largest commune in metropolitan Ouest-Provence and is located at the north end of the Étang de Berre lagoon, adjacent to and northeast of the city of Istres. Miramas station has rail connections to Marseille, Avignon, Martigues and Arles.

Circuit of Miramas

The Circuit of Miramas is located within 2 km of the town. In 1926 it hosted the French Grand Prix which was won by Frenchman Jules Goux driving a Bugatti T39A. Goux, the son of the superintendent at the Peugeot factory, had earlier became famous for winning the 1913 Indianapolis 500 while reportedly consuming four bottles of champagne during the course of the race. Goux had been the first foreign winner at Indianapolis.

Today the racetrack is owned by BMW and used as a vehicle test track.

Population

See also
Communes of the Bouches-du-Rhône department

References

External links

 Official website (in French)

Communes of Bouches-du-Rhône
Bouches-du-Rhône communes articles needing translation from French Wikipedia